Julian Oktawian Zachariewicz-Lwigród (17 July 1837 – 27 December 1898), commonly referred to as Julian Zachariewicz, was an Austro-Hungarian architect and renovator of Armenian descent. Father of Alfred Zachariewicz. Zachariewicz was a graduate of the Royal Polytechnic Institute in Vienna, and a professor and rector (1881–1882) of the Lemberg Polytechnic.

Life
He was born in Lemberg, Austrian Empire (Polish: Lwów, now Lviv, Ukraine) to an Armenian family. 
He graduated from the Vienna University of Technology. Until 1870, he held numerous positions as a qualified engineer in the Austrian State Railways. In 1871, he was offered the post of director of the newly-established Faculty of Civil Engineering at the Lviv Technical Academy (now Lviv Polytechnic). As a consequence, he returned to Lviv and worked as professor at the academy and was appointed dean of the Faculty of Civil Engineering. Between 1877–1878 and 1881–1882 he served as rector of the Lviv Polytechnic. In 1877, he received the "Ritter" title of Austrian nobility (Grade II) with the predicate "von Lwigród". He designed the main building of the Lemberg Polytechnic as well as a separate building of the Faculty of Chemistry. The main building of the polytechnic, known as the "Mother of Polish Technical Universities", was designed in the eclectic Neo-Renaissance style that was fashionable at the time. Zachariewicz made a number of journeys across Germany and Austria before designing the polytechnic, in order to familiarise himself with the newest innovations relating to the construction of this type of building. He also designed numerous public buildings and private residences, including the Iași railway station (1869–70), the Czernowitz Synagogue, the Galician Savings Bank in Lviv, Church of Franciscan Sisters in Lviv, Jan Styka's villa, and the Tyszkiewicz Villa in Vilnius. He also carried out the renovation of the Church of the Holy Family in Tarnów as well as controversial renovations of the Church of Our Lady of the Snow in Lviv and the Church of John the Baptist in Lviv.

In 1894, he supervised (alongside Franciszek Skowron) the construction of more than 100 pavilions for the General National Exhibition in Lviv. He is the author of the book Zabytki sztuki w Polsce (Works of Art in Poland) published in 1895.

He died in Lemberg and was interred at the Lychakiv Cemetery.

Gallery

See also
History of Lviv
Teodor Talowski
Zygmunt Gorgolewski

References 

1837 births
1898 deaths
Architects from Lviv
People from the Kingdom of Galicia and Lodomeria
Polish Austro-Hungarians
TU Wien alumni
Lviv Polytechnic alumni
19th-century Polish architects
Lviv Polytechnic rectors